Meenlaragh is a village and townland located in County Donegal, Ireland.

According to the 2016 census of Ireland, it has the highest proportion of Irish language speakers in Ireland. Over 70% of the residents speak Irish on a daily basis.

References

Towns and villages in County Donegal
Townlands of County Donegal
Gaeltacht places in County Donegal